Firoz Minar (also known as Firuz Minar) (English: Tower of Firoz/Firuz) is a five-storeyed tower situated at Gaur, West Bengal, India. It was built by Sultan Saifuddin Firuz Shah of the Habshi dynasty between 1485 and 1489. It was built in the Tughlaqi style of architecture. Although the first three storeys are dodecagonal, the final two are circular in shape.

Location

Firoz Minor is located one kilometre away from the Dakhil Darwaza at the city of Gaur.

History
The minar was built by Sultan Saifuddin Firuz Shah of the Habshi dynasty. The construction started in 1485 and ended in 1489. Colloquially, the tower is referred as Pir Asa Mandir and Chiragh Dani. The tower also commemorates Firuz Shah's victories in the battlefield. According to tradition, Firuz Shah threw the chief architect from the topmost storey as he was not satisfied with the minar's height and wanted it to be taller.

Architecture
The minar resembles the Qutb Minar of Delhi. Firoz Minar is five storeyed structure. The first three stories are dodecagonal while the next two are circular in shape. A spiral 73 step staircase leads to its top. Although there was a dome at the topmost storey, it was replaced by a flat roof due to restoration work.

The minar is built in Tughlaqi architecture and there are terracotta works on its walls. The tower sits on top of a masonry plinth.

References

Buildings and structures completed in 1489
Architecture of the Bengal Sultanate
Minarets in India